Magelang is one of six cities in Central Java that are administratively independent of the regencies in which they lie geographically. Each of these cities is governed by a mayor rather than a bupati. Magelang city covers an area of 18.12 km2 and has a population of 118,227 at the 2010 census and 121,526 at the 2020 census. It is located in the middle of the Magelang Regency, between Mount Merbabu and Mount Sumbing in Central Java Province, Indonesia, and lies 43 km north of Yogyakarta, 15 km north of Mungkid and 75 km south of Semarang, the capital of Central Java.

History

Magelang was established on 11 April 907. Magelang was then known as a village called Mantyasih, which is now known as Meteseh.

There are three stele of historical importance in Magelang, namely Poh, Gilikan and Mantyasih, all of which are written on a plate of copper. Poh and Mantyasih were written under the rule of King Balitung of Mataram Kingdom. In those stele, the villages of Mantyasih and Glanggang were mentioned. They became Meteseh and Magelang respectively.

On the Mantyasih stele, it mentioned the name of King Watukura Dyah Balitung, as well as 829 Çaka bulan Çaitra tanggal 11 Paro-Gelap Paringkelan Tungle, Pasaran Umanis hari Senais Sçara atau Sabtu, which means Saturday Legi, 11 April 907. The village Mantyasih was made by the king as tax-free village which was led by a patih (similar to Prime Minister nowadays). Also mentioned are Mount Susundara and Mount Wukir Sumbing which is now known as Mount Sindoro and Mount Sumbing.

When Britain colonised Magelang in the eighteenth century, Magelang became the seat of the government and was made to the same level as a regency with Mas Ngabehi Danukromo as its first leader (Bupati). Mas Ngabehi Danukromo built Alun-Alun (town square), bupati residence and a mosque. Magelang became the capital of Karesidenan Kedu in 1818.

After the Dutch defeated the British, Magelang was made as the central of economy because its strategic location. The Dutch government built drinking water tower (known locally as Menara Air Minum) in 1918 which provides the city with water. Electricity became available in 1927. The roads were remade using asphalt.

The city has historically been a military post, dating back to the Dutch East Indies colonial era. It subsequently acted as an army stronghold for Indonesian pro-independence movements against the Dutch government during the resistance period. It is a host of two military landmarks: The National Military Academy, and the only military-associated school, Taruna Nusantara.

Journalist Taichiro Kaijimura announced on 12 May 2007 the discovery of 30 Netherlands government documents submitted to the Tokyo tribunal as an evidence of a forced massed prostitution incident by the Japanese army in 1944 in Magelang.

After the independence of Indonesia, Magelang became kotapraja (same level as a district) and then kotamadya (same level as city).

Geography

Magelang City is a city which is located in a fertile agricultural area which is one of the most densely populated regions on Central Java. Magelang City has two borders; the western border is the Progo River and the eastern Boones Elo River.

Administrative districts
The city is divided into three districts (kecamatan) comprising 17 urban villages (kelurahan).

Magelang Utara (North Magelang):
 Kramat Utara
 Kramat Selatan
 Kedungsari
 Wates
 Potrobangsan

Magelang Tengah (Central Magelang):
 Magelang
 Cacaban
 Kemirirejo
 Gelangan
 Panjang
 Rejowinangun Utara

Magelang Selatan (South Magelang):
 Tidar Utara
 Tidar Selatan
 Rejowinangun Selatan
 Magersari
 Jurangombo Utara
 Jurangombo Selatan

Climate

Demography
The people of Magelang mostly are Javanese and has a diverse set of belief and religion. The majority of Magelang's population follow Islam (85.68%), but there are minority groups such as Christianity (13.80%), Buddhism (0.4%), Hinduism (0.08%), and there are also spiritualism and traditional Javanese belief (0.01%).

Based on the 2020 census, Magelang has a total population of 121,526. Magelang's population was 60,234 men (49% of the total population) and 61,292 women (51% of the total population).

Places of interest

Temples
Just 12 km from the town centre is Candi Selogriyo, an eighth-century Hindu temple near the village of Candisari. The Canggal Temple, also located in the Magelang regency, has a Sanskrit transcription bearing the name of the first Mataram Kingdom ruler, Sanjaya.

Rafting
There is white water rafting on the Elo River, located in the district of Magelang. The Elo River disgorges from Mount Merbabu, Mount Telomoyo and Mount Ungaran, so it is not affected by the flow of volcanic material from Mount Merapi. The river is ideal for white water rafting because the characters of flow and flooding are relatively stable, so it is relatively safe to be forded in both the dry and rainy seasons. Running rafting chosen difficulty level (grade) maximum III + and suitable for families. The track has a length of about 12.5 km and reached in 2.5 – 3 hours rafting.

Museums
A number of the town's buildings from the Dutch East Indies era have become heritage landmarks. The Karesidenan Kedu building, is now known as Museum Kamar Pengabdian Diponegoro, where Prince Diponegoro was arrested by the Dutch colonial government during the Java War (1825–1830). The chair on which the Prince sat remains in the museum. A fingernail, believed to be Diponegoro's, remains on the arm of the chair. A statue in his honour stands in Magelang's town square.

Jalan Pemuda
Jalan Pemuda ("Youth Street") is Magelang's Pecinan (Chinatown). The one-way  road is the centre of business and includes shops, a minimarket, and restaurants. The road, running along a former railroad, is divided with a narrow section reserved for rickshaws.

Alun-alun (town square)
The alun-alun or town square is located in the city centre. The area has the Matahari and Gardena department stores, Magelang's only cinema, to the north, the Trio Plaza and the BCA tower; in the south, a police station, the BPD Bank building, and a Confucian temple along Jalan Pemuda. In the west, lies the city's largest mosque, locally known as Kauman. Within the vicinity of the town square is a  watertower, and also a statue of Diponegoro riding a horse.

Sports
There are a number of sport venues in Magelang. In 2006, for example, a golf course was opened: the Borobudur International Golf and Country Club. The Abu Bakrin football stadium is located on Jl. Tidar, which is near the golf course. Besides, the Gedung Olah Raga "Samapta" is a popular sport venue in the sub-district of North Magelang. The area is being developed because of the plan to raise its status to Sport Centre of the Central Java. It is located in the east of the Progo River. Stadion Gemilang Kabupaten Magelang is located in the town of Blondo. It has a capacity of 15,000 and it is used mostly for football matches.

Parks
A 28-hectare park, Kyai Langgeng, is located at Cempaka Street approximately one kilometer south of the city centre. Research is undertaken on rare plant species here. The park has a playground for children and their families. The river Progo is accessible from this park.

Badaan park is located in Jalan Pahlawan (Pahlawan Road) and one of two parks in Magelang. The park is smaller than Kyai Langgeng and mostly regarded as a children's playground. There are animal statues within the park such as rhino the animal used as its namesake, elephant and giraffe. Hawkers sell a variety of bakso (Meat Balls) in the vicinity of the park.

Mount Tidar

Mount Tidar is located in Magersari, South Magelang and located within the complex of Military Academy (Akmil). Here lies the remains of Syekh Subakir from Iran.

Universities
Although Magelang City is a small city, it has several universities, colleges, and academies. At least, there are six universities located in Magelang City such as Indonesian Military Academy (Akmil), Muhammadiyah University of Magelang (Unimma), Tidar University (Untidar), STMIK Bina Patria, and Tirta Wiyata Engineering Academy (Akademi Teknik Tirta Wiyata) and the branch campus of the Health Polytechnic of the Ministry of Health, Semarang.

Transportation

Main transportation which is operating in Magelang are cars, motorcycles, buses, paddy cabs, becak, and bicycles. Today, the most popular of them are cars and motorcycles. Even almost all of the household have a motorcycle as mean of mobility in daily activity. Then, for public transportation is mainly using buses and cars.

Magelang used to have a railway track from Semarang to Yogyakarta passing at its centre (along Jalan Pemuda), but have since been redirected outside the city. Unfortunately, today the railway track does not function again. It was closed by the government due to the operational cost in that time.

Magelang does not have its own airport and therefore relies on Yogyakarta's Adisutjipto International Airport, Surakarta's Adisumarmo International Airport and Semarang's Achmad Yani International Airport. Then, to reach the airport, especially Adisucipto, from Magelang needs about one hour by bus or car or taxi. But today the easier way to reach Adi Sucipto International Airport in Yogyakarta is by using DAMRI buses that specially operated to carry people from Magelang to Adi Sucipto Airport and its way-back.

November 2011: Due to lava flooding from Mount Merapi through the Kali Putih River in Gempol, Magelang, the main road connecting Magelang and Yogyakarta has several times closed. An estimated Rp.64 billion ($7.3 million) project to build bridge over the river, a 2.3 kilometer-long stream dredge and land acquisition is being built by government.

Motto
Magelang's motto is HARAPAN (in English: Hope). It is made of "Hidup", "Aman", "RAPi", "Asri" dan "Nyaman" (in English: living, safe, tidy, green, and comfort)

Gallery

See also

 List of cities of Indonesia

References

External links
  Direktori Wisata Magelang

 
Populated places in Central Java
907 establishments
Populated places established in the 10th century